The 8×63mm patron m/32 was a bottlenecked centrefire cartridge with a slightly rebated rim for Swedish heavy and medium machine guns. It was used from 1932 to the finalisation of the re-chambering process of these machine guns to 7.62×51mm NATO in 1975.

History 

Given the experiences of the devastating effect of small arms fire, including the long-range, even indirect fire of the machine guns, in the Russo-Japanese War and World War I, as well as a revolution in terminal ballistic calculations, calibre-related concerns occupied a lot of attention worldwide in military establishments. Sweden was no exception, and series of trials in calibres 6mm-12mm were conducted until the late 1920s. After study-travels by Lieutenant Colonel de Laval along with Captains Nygren and Holmgren, mainly to Germany and the Netherlands in October 1930, Royal Swedish Army Materiel Administration (Kungliga Armétygförvaltningen (KAF) appointed a commission that conducted a series of tests with calibres 6,5 mm to 7,2 – 7,5 – 7,9 mm, and bullet weights between 8.4 grams and 17.0 grams, with the intention to either recommend a new calibre for the kulspruta m14-29 or retain the 6.5×55mm but with a new boat tailed spitzer bullet, as the old blunt nosed projectile m/94 had inferior ballistics.
The commission found that at ranges below , no recommendation could be given without indepth analysis of intended tasks within the tactical doctrine. Based on this, KAF tasked AB Bofors to develop and manufacture the larger rifle cartridge to meet these needs.

Design 
The patron m/32 round had the same overall length as the .30-06 Springfield cartridge, which allowed it to fit in the standard Browning receiver, but used a larger diameter case and share the 6.5×55mm  diameter bolt face. Compared to the 1928 pattern .30-06 Springfield M1 Ball the 8×63mm patron m/32 was loaded with  S bore  bullets and had more muzzle energy.

Reverse engineering the trajectory from the previous sentence indicates a ballistic coefficient (G1 BC) of approximately 0.63.
Available with armour piercing bullets, patron m/32 was used in the UN-forces' KP-bil during the Congo-crisis against the separatists' armoured cars.

The 8×63mm patron m/32 cartridge was used in the following machine guns:
 Kulspruta m/14-29
 Flygplanskulspruta m/22
 Kulspruta m/36
 Kulspruta m/39
 Kulspruta m/42

The 8×63mm patron m/32 was also used in the gevär / pansarvärnsgevär m/40 bolt-action rifle, Karabiner 98k's re-chambered in Sweden for the patron m/32. Originally purchased as the pvg m/39 in 8×57 IS as a stop-gap anti-tank rifle (despite being unsuited for the role), the re-chambered  8×63 rifles were designated m/40, and later issued to machine gun crews so their rifles would fire the same round as their machine guns. Besides the rechambering a muzzle brake was added necessitated by the additional recoil produced by the more powerful 8×63mm patron m/32 cartridge.

Military ammunition

See also
List of Swedish military calibres
8 mm caliber

References

External links

8x63 M32 Bofors
HISTORIC MACHINE GUN CARTRIDGES by Anthony G Williams
8x63 Swedish / 8x63 Bofors (in Russian)
8x63 Swedish Bofors / 8 mm Bofors / 8x63 Swedish For MG Mod.1932 / 8mm SK PTR M-32 / 8mm Sueco / 8x63 / SAA 4540 / XCR 08 063 BGC 010 (In Spanish)
The Swedish military ammunition site
Ammunitionsregister för armén, 1960
instruction drawings of 8×63mm patron m/32 ammunition
Military Small Arms Ammunition of the World, 1945-1980, P. Labbett

Pistol and rifle cartridges
Military cartridges